River View High School is a public high school in Warsaw, Ohio, USA. It is the only high school in the River View school district.

Athletics

Teams
Fall: cheerleading (girls), cross country (boys/girls), golf (boys/girls), soccer (boys/girls), volleyball (girls), American football (boys)
Winter: cheerleading (girls), basketball (boys), swimming (boys/girls), wrestling (boys)
Spring: baseball (boys), softball (girls), track (boys/girls)

Ohio High School Athletic Association State Championships

 Boys' basketball – 1975
 Girls' basketball – 1977, 1982, 2006, 2007

Notable alumni
Danielle Peck - country music singer

References

External links
 District website

High schools in Coshocton County, Ohio
Public high schools in Ohio